NBA Action is a weekly show with news and highlights of the NBA.  The show premiered in 1990 on ESPN. It airs on NBA TV with new episodes at 6:30 ET/5:30 CT every Thursday night during the season.

Features (in chronological order)
 Western Conference Team of the Week
 Instant Replay (Weekly NBA News)
 Timeout (Player Features)
 Eastern Conference Team of the Week
 Spotlight (Special features on players, teams or great moments in the NBA)
 Sounds of the Game
 Courtside Countdown (Showcasing the Top 10 Plays, Dunks, Buzzer Beaters, Assists and Blocks during the week)

Hosts
Jim Fagan (1990–2004)
Spero Dedes (2004–2005)
Ian Eagle (2005–present)
Rich Ackerman (2003–present; occasional host)

Video game
There was a series of video games released by Sega Sports for the Sega Genesis, Sega Game Gear and Sega Saturn with the name NBA Action.

NBA Action '94 (Genesis)
NBA Action '95 (Game Gear and Genesis)
NBA Action (1996) (Saturn)
NBA Action 98 (Saturn and PC)

International broadcasts
By region

Latín America 
 ESPN 
 Fox Sports 
 Bein Sports 
 DIRECTV Sports 
 Telecanal Plus (Argentina) Saturday at 02:00 pm
 TV CABLE (Ecuador)
 TVC Deportes (México) Friday at 11:00 pm
 Unicanal Plus (Paraguay) Saturday at 02:00 pm  
 Telecable TV (Peru) Sunday at 07:00 pm 
 VTV Plus (Uruguay)  Saturday at 02:00 pm
 Meridiano TV (Venezuela) Sunday at 08:00 pm

Brazil 

 ESPN  
 Fox Sports
 Rede Record (Sunday at 11:30 pm in Free TV)

Philippines
TV5
One Sports
Radio Philippines Network
Solar TV
CNN Philippines
GMA Network
Intercontinental Broadcasting Corporation
People's Television Network
ABS-CBN
Studio 23
ABS-CBN Sports+Action
Basketball TV
 NBA Premium TV

Europe

C More/TV4 (Sweden)  Airs in news and documentary orientated sports channel Sportkanalen
 TV 2 (Denmark)
 Canal+ Premium (Poland)
 ESPN (The Netherlands)
SportTv (Hungary)

External links
About the Show

Action
ESPN original programming
Fox Sports Networks original programming
NBA TV original programming
Radio Philippines Network original programming
1990 American television series debuts
2000s American television series
2010s American television series